The Northing Tramp is a 1926 crime novel by the British writer Edgar Wallace.

It was adapted for the film Strangers on Honeymoon (1936) directed by Albert de Courville.

References

Bibliography
 Goble, Alan. The Complete Index to Literary Sources in Film. Walter de Gruyter, 1999.

External links
 
 The Northing Tramp at Project Gutenberg Australia

1926 British novels
British crime novels
British novels adapted into films
Novels by Edgar Wallace